Simone Loiodice (born March 16, 1989 in Rome) is an Italian professional football player who currently plays for APD Loops Ribelle.

References

1989 births
Living people
Italian footballers
A.S.D. Victor San Marino players
Expatriate footballers in San Marino
Association football midfielders
Campionato Sammarinese di Calcio players